KEYU may refer to:

 KEYU (TV), a television station (channel 31) licensed to serve Borger, Texas, United States
 KVWE (FM), a radio station (102.9 FM) licensed to serve Amarillo, Texas, which held the call sign KEYU-FM from 2014 to 2019